In coding theory, the Sardinas–Patterson algorithm is a classical algorithm for determining in polynomial time whether a given variable-length code is uniquely decodable, named after August Albert Sardinas and George W. Patterson, who published it in 1953. The algorithm carries out a systematic search for a string which admits two different decompositions into codewords. As Knuth reports, the algorithm was rediscovered about ten years later in 1963 by Floyd, despite the fact that it was at the time already well known in coding theory.

Idea of the algorithm

Consider the code  . This code, which is based on an example by Berstel, is an example of a code which is not uniquely decodable, since the string

011101110011

can be interpreted as the sequence of codewords

01110 – 1110 – 011,

but also as the sequence of codewords

011 – 1 – 011 – 10011.

Two possible decodings of this encoded string are thus given by cdb and babe.

 for some "dangling suffix" .

In the second round, we try out two different approaches: the first trial is to look for a codeword that has w as prefix. Then we obtain a new dangling suffix w''', with which we can continue our search. If we eventually encounter a dangling suffix that is itself a codeword (or the empty word), then the search will terminate, as we know there exists a string with two decompositions. The second trial is to seek for a codeword that is itself a prefix of w. In our example, we have , and the sequence 1 is a codeword. We can thus also continue with w'=0 as the new dangling suffix.

Precise description of the algorithm

The algorithm is described most conveniently using quotients of formal languages. In general, for two sets of strings D and N, the (left) quotient  is defined as the residual words obtained from D by removing some prefix in N. Formally, . Now let  denote the (finite) set of codewords in the given code.

The algorithm proceeds in rounds, where we maintain in each round not only one dangling suffix as described above, but the (finite) set of all potential dangling suffixes. The sets  are defined inductively as follows:

. Here, the symbol  denotes the empty word.

, for all .

As soon as one of the  contains a word from C or the empty word, then the algorithm terminates and answers that the given code is not uniquely decodable. Otherwise, once a set 
Instead of continuing endlessly, it answers that the given code is uniquely decodable.

Termination and correctness of the algorithm
Since visiting one of the sets for the second time will cause the algorithm to stop, the algorithm cannot continue endlessly and thus must always terminate. More precisely, the total number of dangling suffixes that the algorithm considers is at most equal to the total of the lengths of the codewords in the input, so the algorithm runs in polynomial time as a function of this input length. By using a suffix tree to speed the comparison between each dangling suffix and the codewords, the time for the algorithm can be bounded by O(nk), where n is the total length of the codewords and k is the number of codewords. The algorithm can be implemented using a pattern matching machine. The algorithm can also be implemented to run on a nondeterministic Turing machine that uses only logarithmic space; the problem of testing unique decipherability is NL-complete, so this space bound is optimal.

A proof that the algorithm is correct, i.e. that it always gives the correct answer, is found in the textbooks by Salomaa and by Berstel et al.

See also

Kraft's inequality in some cases provides a quick way to exclude the possibility that a given code is uniquely decodable.
Prefix codes and block codes are important classes of codes which are uniquely decodable by definition.
Timeline of information theory

Notes

References
 
 
 
.
.
.
 
.

Further reading

 Robert G. Gallager: Information Theory and Reliable Communication.'' Wiley, 1968

Algorithms
Coding theory
Data compression